{{DISPLAYTITLE:Prostaglandin EP1 receptor}}

Prostaglandin E2 receptor 1 (EP1) is a 42kDa prostaglandin receptor encoded by the PTGER1 gene. EP1 is one of four identified EP receptors, EP1, EP2, EP3, and EP4 which bind with and mediate cellular responses principally to prostaglandin E2) (PGE2) and also but generally with lesser affinity and responsiveness to certain other prostanoids (see Prostaglandin receptors). Animal model studies have implicated EP1 in various physiological and pathological responses. However, key differences in the distribution of EP1 between these test animals and humans as well as other complicating issues make it difficult to establish the function(s) of this receptor in human health and disease.

Gene
The PTGER1 gene is located on human chromosome 19 at position p13.12 (i.e. 19p13.12), contains 2 introns and 3 exons, and codes for a G protein-coupled receptor (GPCR) of the rhodopsin-like receptor family, Subfamily A14 (see rhodopsin-like receptors#Subfamily A14).

Expression
Studies in mice, rats, and guinea pigs have found EP1 Messenger RNA and protein to be expressed in the papillary collecting ducts of the kidney, in the kidney, lung, stomach, thalamus, and in the dorsal root ganglia neurons as well as several central nervous system sites. However, the expression of EP1 In humans, its expression appears to be more limited: EP1 receptors have been detected in human mast cells, pulmonary veins, keratinocytes, myometrium, and colon smooth muscle.

Ligands

Activating ligands
The following standard prostaglandins have the following relative potencies in binding to and activating EP1: PGE2≥PGE1>PGF2alpha>PGD2. The receptor binding affinity Dissociation constant Kd (i.e. ligand concentration needed to bind with 50% of available EP1 receptors) is ~20 nM and that of PGE1 ~40 for the mouse receptor and ~25 nM for PGE2 with the human receptor.

Because PGE2 activates multiple prostanoid receptors and has a short half-life in vivo due to its rapidly metabolism in cells by omega oxidation and beta oxidation], metabolically resistant EP1-selective activators are useful for the study of EP1's function and could be clinically useful for the treatment of certain diseases. Only one such agonist that is highly selective in stimulating EP1 has been synthesized and identified, ONO-D1-OO4. This compound has a Ki inhibitory binding value (see Biochemistry#Receptor/ligand binding affinity) of 150 nM compared to that of 25 nM for PGE2 and is therefore ~5 times weaker than PGE2.

Inhibiting ligands
SC51322 (Ki=13.8 nM), GW-848687 (Ki=8.6 nM), ONO-8711, SC-19220, SC-51089, and several other synthetic compounds given in next cited reference are selective competitive antagonists for EP1 that have been used for studies in animal models of human diseases. Carbacylin, 17-phenyltrinor PGE1, and several other tested compounds are dual EP1/EP3 antagonists (most marketed prostanoid receptor antagonists exhibit poor receptor selectivity).

Mechanism of cell activation
When initially bound to PGE2 or other stimulating ligand, EP1 mobilizes G proteins containing the Gq alpha subunit (Gαq/11)-G beta-gamma complex. These two subunits in turn stimulate the Phosphoinositide 3-kinase pathway that raises cellular cytosolic Ca2+ levels thereby regulating Ca2+-sensitive cell signal pathways which include, among several others, those that promote the activation of certain protein kinase C isoforms. Since, this rise in cytosolic Ca2+ can also contract muscle cells, EP1 has been classified as a contractile type of prostanoid receptor. The activation of protein kinases C feeds back to phosphorylate and thereby desensitizes the activated EP1 receptor (see homologous desensitization but may also desensitize other types of prostanoid and non-prostanoid receptors (see heterologous desensitization). These desensitizations limit further EP1 receptor activation within the cell. Concurrently with the mobilization of these pathways, ligand-activated EP1 stimulates ERK, p38 mitogen-activated protein kinases, and CREB pathways that lead to cellular functional responses.

Function 
Studies using animals genetically engineered to lack EP1 and supplemented by studies using treatment with EP1 receptor antagonists and agonists indicate that this receptor serves several functions. 1) It mediates hyperalgesia due to EP11 receptors located in the central nervous system but suppresses pain perception due to E1 located on dorsal root ganglia neurons in rats. Thus, PGE2 causes increased pain perception when administered into the central nervous system but inhibits pain perception when administered systemically; 2)  It promotes colon cancer development in Azoxymethane-induced and APC gene knockout mice. 3) It promotes hypertension in diabetic mice and spontaneously hypertensive rats. 4) It suppresses stress-induced impulsive behavior and social dysfunction in mice by suppressing the activation of Dopamine receptor D1 and Dopamine receptor D2 signaling. 5)  It enhances the differentiation of uncommitted T cell lymphocytes to the Th1 cell phenotype and may thereby favor the development of inflammatory rather than allergic responses to immune stimulation in rodents. Studies with human cells indicate that EP1 serves a similar function on T cells. 6) It may reduce expression of Sodium-glucose transport proteins in the apical membrane or cells of the intestinal mucosa in rodents. 7) It may be differentially involved in etiology of acute brain injuries. Pharmacological inhibition or genetic deletion of EP1 receptor produce either beneficial or deleterious effects in rodent models of neurological disorders such as ischemic stroke,  epileptic seizure, surgically induced brain injury and traumatic brain injury.

Clinical studies 
EP1 receptor antagonists have been studied clinically primarily to treat hyperalgesia. Numerous EP antagonists have been developed including SC51332, GW-848687X, a benzofuran-containing drug that have had some efficacy in treating various hyperalgesic syndromes in animal models. None have as yet been reported to be useful in humans.

See also 
 Prostaglandin receptors
 Prostanoid receptors
 Prostaglandin E2 receptor 2 (EP2)
 Prostaglandin E2 receptor 3 (EP3)
 Prostaglandin E2 receptor 4 (EP4)
 Eicosanoid receptor

References

Further reading

External links 
 

G protein-coupled receptors